The 2017 World Allround Speed Skating Championships were held at the Vikingskipet in Hamar, Norway, from 4 to 5 March 2017.

Schedule

Medal summary

Medal table

Medalists

References

External links
Entries, results and announcements
ISU website

 
World Allround Speed Skating Championships
World Allround Speed Skating Championships
2017 Allround
World Allround Speed Skating Championships
World Allround
Sport in Hamar